Pseudatteria molybdophanes is a species of moth of the family Tortricidae. It is found in Peru.

The wingspan is about 30 mm. The ground colour of the forewings is orange. The markings are leaden grey. The hindwings are orange, tinged yellow costally. The wing base, the spots along the edges and across the middle of the wing are black.

Etymology
The species name refers to the colouration of the forewing and is derived from Greek molybdon (meaning "lead") and phanes (meaning "having the appearance of").

References

Moths described in 2008
Pseudatteria
Moths of South America
Taxa named by Józef Razowski